Andrea Gonzaga, Count of San Paolo (died 1686), was a member of the Italian House of Gonzaga, belonging to the cadet branch which ruled the Duchy of Guastalla.

Biography 

He was the ninth son of Ferrante II Gonzaga, Duke of Guastalla, and his wife Vittoria Doria, daughter of Giovanni Andrea Doria, eighth prince of Melfi.

In 1626 he bought from his father the fiefs of Serracapriola, Chieuti and San Paolo di Civitate, becoming Count of San Paolo.
He married Laura Crispiano, of the family of the Marchesi of Fusara, with whom he had six children; one, Vincenzo was later sovereign Duke of Guastalla.

See also 

 Duchy of Guastalla
 House of Gonzaga

References

Sources 

 

1686 deaths
Andrea
17th-century Italian nobility
Year of birth unknown